The women's single sculls event at the 2020 Summer Olympics took place from 23 to 30 July 2021 at the Sea Forest Waterway. 32 rowers from 32 nations competed.

Background

This was the 12th appearance of the event, which has been held every year since women's rowing was introduced in 1976.

The World Champions since the 2016 Games are Jeannine Gmelin of Switzerland, (2017) and Sanita Pušpure, (2018 and 2019) of Ireland. Both rowers qualified for the 2020 regatta.

Qualification

Each National Olympic Committee (NOC) is limited to a single boat (one rower) in the event. There are 32 qualifying places in the women's single sculls:

 9 from the 2019 World Championship
 5 from the Asia & Oceania qualification regatta
 5 from the Africa qualification regatta
 5 from the Americas qualification regatta
 3 from the Europe qualification regatta
 2 from the final qualification regatta
 1 host nation place
 2 invitational places

The COVID-19 pandemic delayed many of the events for qualifying for rowing.

Competition format

This rowing event is a single scull event, meaning that each boat is propelled by a single rower. The "scull" portion means that the rower uses two oars, one on each side of the boat; this contrasts with sweep rowing in which each rower has one oar and rows on only one side (not feasible for singles events). The competition consists of multiple rounds. The competition continues to use the five-round format introduced in 2012. Finals are held to determine the placing of each boat; these finals are given letters with those nearer to the beginning of the alphabet meaning a better ranking. Semifinals are named based on which finals they feed, with each semifinal having two possible finals. The course uses the 2000 metres distance that became the Olympic standard in 1912.

During the first round six heats are held. The first three boats in each heat advance to the quarterfinals, while all others are relegated to the repechages.

The repechage is a round which offers rowers a second chance to qualify for the quarterfinals. Placing in the repechage heats determines which quarterfinal the boat would race in. The top two boats in each repechage heat move on to the quarterfinals, with the remaining boats going to the E/F semifinals.

The four quarterfinals are the second round for rowers still competing for medals. Placing in the quarterfinal heats determines which semifinal the boat would race in. The top three boats in each quarterfinal move on to the A/B semifinals, with the bottom three boats going to the C/D semifinals.

Six semifinals are held, two each of A/B semifinals, C/D semifinals, and E/F semifinals. For each semifinal race, the top three boats move on to the better of the two finals, while the bottom three boats go to the lesser of the two finals possible. For example, a second-place finish in an A/B semifinal would result in advancement to the A final.

The fifth and final round is the finals. Each final determines a set of rankings. The A final determines the medals, along with the rest of the places through 6th. The B final gives rankings from 7th to 12th, the C from 13th to 18th, and so on. Thus, to win a medal rowers have to finish in the top three of their heat (or top two of their repechage heat), top three of their quarterfinal, and top three of their A/B semifinal to reach the A final.

Schedule

The competition is held over eight days. Times given are session start times; multiple rowing events might have races during a session.

All times are Japan Standard Time (UTC+9)

Results

Heats
The first three of each heat qualify for the quarterfinals, while the remainder go to the repechage.

Heat 1

Heat 2

Heat 3

Heat 4

Heat 5

Heat 6

Repechage

The first two in each heat qualify for the quarterfinals; the rest go to Semifinals E/F (out of medal contention).

Repechage heat 1

Repechage heat 2

Repechage heat 3

Quarterfinals

The first three of each heat qualify to Semifinal A/B, while the remainder go to Semifinal C/D (out of medal contention).

Quarterfinal 1

Quarterfinal 2

Quarterfinal 3

Quarterfinal 4

Semifinals

The first three of each heat qualify to the better final (E, C, A) while the remainder go to the lower final (F, D, B).

Semifinal A/B 1

Semifinal A/B 2

Semifinal C/D 1

Semifinal C/D 2

Semifinal E/F 1

Semifinal E/F 2

Finals

Final F

Final E

Final D

Final C

Final B

Final A

References

Women's single sculls
Women's events at the 2020 Summer Olympics